Angry Planet is a 39-part television series broadcast around the world featuring the adventures of storm chaser George Kourounis. Angry Planet is produced by Peter Rowe of Pinewood Films. The series plays on the following networks:

Pivot TV (US)
Outdoor Life Network (Canada)
The Weather Network (Canada)
Travel Channel (Europe, Romania)
Weather Channel (Australia)
TV8 (Sweden)
MTV3 (Finland)
Canal Evasion (Quebec)
TVB (Hong Kong)

The first season of the series has also been released on DVD as a box set.

Each episode focuses on a different force of nature as Kourounis gets up close to investigate and document the most fierce natural phenomena the Earth has to dish out.

Seasons

Season One
Tornadoes
Winds of Autumn
Wild Weather Season
Yukon Wildfires
African Hellhole
Desert Monsoon
Volcanic Wedding
Avalanches
Blizzards
Sailing around Cape Horn
Rope traverse of the Boiling Lake
Wild Water
Midwest Stormfest

Season Two
Island Caving
Hurricanes
Waterspouts
Hawaii Surf & Snow
Thunder Down Under
Hottest & Coldest
Italia Wild
West Coast Winter Weather
Iceland - Fire & Ice
Timbuktu - Birthplace of Hurricanes
Indian Monsoon
Java - Land of Fire
Indonesia

Season Three
Hurricane Triple Threat
Elephant Cave
Soviet Eco-Disasters
Costa Rica
Antarctica
Arctic Winter
Newest Land on Earth
Highway to Hail
Defying Gravity
Under Pressure
Crystal Cave
Venezuela Lightning
Empty Quarter Arabia

The series was produced from 2006 to 2010.

Awards
 George Kourounis was nominated twice for a Gemini Award for Best Host for the series.
 Peter Rowe was nominated for a Gemini Award for Best Direction in a Reality Show.
 Peter Rowe won a Canadian Society of Cinematographers (CSC) Award for Best Cinematography in a Reality/Lifestyle Show for the series in 2010.

External links
 Kourounis' website, contains latest news of filming Angry Planet (retrieved 4 December 2006).

2000s Canadian reality television series
2010s Canadian reality television series
2007 Canadian television series debuts
2010 Canadian television series endings
Storm chasing